The 1975 All-Ireland Senior Football Championship was the 89th staging of the All-Ireland Senior Football Championship, the Gaelic Athletic Association's premier inter-county Gaelic football tournament. The championship began on 25 May 1975 and ended on 28 September 1975.

Dublin were the defending champions. London fielded a team in the senior championship for the first time.

On 28 September 1975, Kerry won the championship following a 2-12 to 0-11 defeat of Dublin in the All-Ireland final. This was their 23rd All-Ireland title, their first in five championship seasons.

Dublin's Jimmy Keaveney was the championship's top scorer with 1-38. Kerry's John O'Keeffe was the choice for Texaco Footballer of the Year.

Format
The usual knock-out four-province setup was used.  played in the Connacht Senior Football Championship for the first time.
Leinster Championship format change saw, Second round dropped this year first round winners go straight to the Quarter-finals. Kilkenny return to Leinster football for the first time since 1963.

Rule change
As a result of a decision taken at the Gaelic Athletic Association's (GAA) annual congress the previous year, as of 1975 all provincial finals, All-Ireland semi-finals and the All-Ireland final itself were reduced to 70 minutes playing time.  Prior to this all championship matches were eighty minutes in duration for the past 5 years.

Results

Connacht Senior Football Championship

Quarter-finals

Semi-finals

  

Finals

Leinster Senior Football Championship

First round

Quarter-finals

Semi-finals

 

Final

Munster Senior Football Championship

Quarter-finals

Semi-finals

Final

Ulster Senior Football Championship

Preliminary round

Quarter-finals

Semi-finals

Final

All-Ireland Senior Football Championship

Semi-finals

Final

Championship statistics

Miscellaneous

 All championship games were reduced from eighty to seventy minutes.
 London join the Connacht championship.
 On 1 June 1975, The Cricket Field, Kilrush played host to its 1st championship game for 35 years as Clare play Waterford in a Munster Quarter-Final.
 Louth beat Meath for the first time since 1953.
 Kildare play Westmeath in the Leinster championship for the first time since 1960.
 Sligo won their first Connacht title since 1928 and last until 2007.
 Dublin play Kildare in the Leinster final for the first time since 1928.
 Kerry-Sligo All Ireland semi-final was the first meeting between the teams.

Top scorers
Overall

Single game

References